St. Mary's College is a multi-faith school located in Kegalle, Sabaragamuwa Province, Sri Lanka. Established in 1867, it is the oldest boys' school in the city. In 2023 it had approximately 3,000 students and 135 teaching staff.

History

St. Mary's College was established on 1 March 1867, the fifth Catholic school in the country established by the Benedictine Missionaries. The school was founded as a vernacular English school in 1867 by Rev. Fr. Domenico Pingulani, a Benedictine missionary, in connection with St. Mary's Church. It initially had 22 students and one teacher.

The Jesuit Missionaries took over the running of the school in 1893. In 1902 Lucian van Langenberg was appointed the school's principal. In 1921 Rev. Fr. Berneart took over the administration of the school and by 1922 it had 110 students enrolled. In 1933 Rev. Fr. P. M. Baguet was appointed as principal. In 1947 St. Mary's College was elevated to a secondary school, with classes in English, Sinhala and Tamil. The same year the house system was re-introduced to the school, with the houses named after colours: Red, Blue, Green and Gold. In 1960 it was changed to a government school with 688 students enrolled and 36 staff. The school was elevated to a national school in 1995.

Notable alumni
 Jayanath Colombage - Admiral, Commander of the Sri Lankan Navy (2012–14)
 Tharanga Paranavitana - Test Cricket Player (2009–12)  
 Kandiah Thirugnansampandapillai Francis - Test Cricket Umpire
 Bandu Samarasinghe -actor in Sri Lankan cinema, theater and television

External links
 School sinhala anthem
 150th years anniversary official song
 Old Boys Association (OBA-2004)
 News from Old Boys Association

References

Schools in Kegalle
Boys' schools in Sri Lanka
National schools in Sri Lanka
Educational institutions established in 1867
1867 establishments in Ceylon